Nyíradony is a town in Hajdú-Bihar county, in the Northern Great Plain region of eastern Hungary.

Geography

Places of interest 
 New sports hall with indoor pool and sauna
 Greek Catholic church in the city centre with nice wall paintings
 Ruin of a little chapel that was destroyed by the Tatars in the 12th century

Transportation 
 By car: Highway 471 connects Nyíradony with Debrecen.
 By train: There are sporadic direct connections to Budapest. In general it is necessary to change trains in Debrecen for long distance connections.

Accommodation 
 In the forest (about 3 kilometers east of Nyíradony) there is a hunting lodge with a guesthouse.

External links

  in Hungarian
Information about Nyíradony on 1hungary.com (English)

Populated places in Hajdú-Bihar County
Romanian communities in Hungary